James Leslie Quealey (born 20 June 1917) was an Australian professional rugby league footballer who played in the 1930s and 1940s.  He played for Balmain as a halfback. He was born in Sydney.

Playing career
Quealey made his debut in 1938 for Balmain. The following year, Quealey was a member of the Balmain side which won the 1939 premiership defeating South Sydney 33–4 in the grand final at the Sydney Cricket Ground with Quealey scoring a try in the rout.  In 1940, Quealey was selected to play for New South Wales in an interstate game against Queensland.  Quealey played with Balmain for another 5 seasons but was not a member of the 1944 premiership winning side.  He retired at the end of 1945.

References

1917 births
Possibly living people
Balmain Tigers players
New South Wales rugby league team players
Australian rugby league players
Rugby league players from Sydney
Rugby league halfbacks